Serhiy Yashchenko (born 25 June 1959) is a football manager and former player.

Career
Yashchenko was noticed by coach Boris Kopeikin during his military service and recommended to CSKA Moscow where he spent the 1981 season in the shadow of Aleksandr Tarkhanov, playing only a couple of matches. He then went back to his native Ukraine and to Shakhtar, winning the 1983 Soviet Cup and the 1984 Soviet Super Cup. He played a total of 14 seasons with Shakhtar and won, after the collapse of the USSR, the 1995 Ukrainian Cup.

Yashchenko played couple of friendly matches for the Soviet Olympic football team in 1986 against Czechoslovakia and Sweden. He never played in official competitions for the team.

He became head coach of Ukrainian side FC Metalurh Zaporizhzhya in 2006 and guided them to the first round of the UEFA Cup and a 2–1 aggregate defeat to Panathinaikos FC. He left Zaporizhzhya in April 2007 and took up a position as reserve team coach at FC Metalurh Donetsk. Following the resignation of Jos Daerden as Metalurh head coach in early December 2007, Yashchenko assumed caretaker manager duties at the club before becoming the permanent manager two weeks later.

Statistics for Shakhtar

Honours
 Soviet Cup : 1983
 Soviet Super Cup : 1984
 Ukrainian Cup : 1995

References 

1959 births
Living people
People from Kostiantynivka
Soviet footballers
Ukrainian footballers
Ukrainian football managers
Ukrainian Premier League players
PFC CSKA Moscow players
FC Shakhtar Donetsk players
FC Shakhtar-2 Donetsk players
FC Metalurh Donetsk players
FC Metalurh Zaporizhzhia managers
FC Metalurh Donetsk managers
FC Metalurh-2 Donetsk managers
FC Kremin Kremenchuk managers
Association football midfielders
Sportspeople from Donetsk Oblast